Zinc finger FYVE domain-containing protein 16 is a protein that in humans is encoded by the ZFYVE16 gene.

The ZFYVE16 gene encodes endofin, an endosomal protein implicated in regulating membrane trafficking. It is characterized by the presence of a phosphatidylinositol 3-phosphate-binding FYVE domain positioned in the middle of the molecule (Seet et al., 2004).[supplied by OMIM]

In melanocytic cells ZFYVE16 gene expression may be regulated by MITF.

Interactions 

ZFYVE16 has been shown to interact with TOM1.

References

Further reading